"Erode" Tamilanban, also spelled as Erode Tamizhanban, is a Tamil poet and writer from Tamil Nadu, India. In 2004, he was awarded the Sahitya Akademi Award for Tamil for his poetry collection Vanakkam Valluva  (lit. Greetings, Valluvar). He has also worked as a newsreader for Doordarshan. He is a board member of the Tamil Nadu Iyal Isai Nadaga Mandram.

Awards and recognitions
 S. P. Adithanar Senior Tamil Scholar Award (2017)
Kalaimamani award by Government of Tamil Nadu
Sahitya Akademi award (2004)
Kokkarako award (1969)

Selected works
Silirppugal –  Paari Nilayam (1970)
Andha nandanai eritha neruppin micham  – Poompuhar padhippakam (1982)
Thirumbi vandha thervalam  – Poompuhar padhippakam (1985)
Kannukku veliyae sila kanaakkal  –  Narmada padippakam (1990)
En veetukku ethirae oru erukkan chedi  –  Pablo bharathi padippakam (1995)
Nadai marandha nadhiyum thisai mariya odayum  –  Poompuhar padhippakam (1998)
Anaikkava endra America — Poompuhar padhippakam (1999)
Un veetukku naan vandhirundhen –  Pablo bharathi padippakam (1999)
Bharathidasanodu pathandugal –  vizhigal padippakam (2000)
Vanakkam valluva! –  Poompuhar padhippakam (2000)
Sennimalai cleopatrakkal – Pablo bharathi padippakam (2002)
Vaarthaikal ketta varam –  vizhigal padippakam (2002)
Madhippedugal —  Marudha (2002)
Ivargalodum ivarrodum –  vizhigal padippakam (2003)
Kanakaanum vinaakkal –  vizhigal padippakam (2004)
Minnal urangum podhu – Sri Durga padippakam (2004)
Kadhavai thattiya pazhaya kadhali  –  vizhigal padippakam (2005)
Vidiyal vizhudugal  –  Poompuhar padhippakam (2005)
Kavin kuru nooru –  Pablo bharathi padippakam (2005)
Pablo Neruda paarvaiyil India  –  Pablo Neruda Spanish Latin America Research Institute (2007)
Idugurip peyarallai Islam  – Rahmat arakattalai (2008)
Olaichuvadiyum kurunthagadum  –  Vidivelli veliyeedu (2008)
Solla vandadhu  –  Muthamizh padippagam (2008)
Poems of questions  –  Translation by Gregory James. Arimaa Nokku (2018)
Glow-worm woods  –  Translation by Gregory James. Arimaa Nokku (2019)

References

Living people
Indian male poets
Recipients of the Sahitya Akademi Award in Tamil
Tamil writers
Poets from Tamil Nadu
Year of birth missing (living people)